Kenneth William Wallace (born 27 August 1936) is a former English cricketer.  Wallace was a right-handed batsman who bowled right-arm medium pace.  He was born at Romford, Essex.

Wallace made his first-class debut for Essex against Lancashire in the 1967 County Championship.  He made nine further first-class appearances for the county, the last of which came against Leicestershire in the 1972 County Championship.  In his ten first-class appearances, he scored 219 runs at a batting average of 13.68, with a high score of 55.  This score, which was his only first-class fifty, came against Hampshire in 1967.  He also made two List A appearances for Essex, one in the 1970 John Player League against Sussex and another in the 1972 Gillette Cup against Kent.

References

External links
Ken Wallace at ESPNcricinfo
Ken Wallace at CricketArchive

1936 births
Living people
People from Romford
English cricketers
Essex cricketers